Our father is Bandera, Ukraine is our mother! (Ukrainian: «Батько наш — Бандера, Україна — мати!») is a Ukrainian patriotic song about a heavily wounded Ukrainian rebel and his mourning mother. Almost completely identical folk melody is recorded in the collection "For the Freedom of Ukraine" for the song "Zazhurilsya guys". Also known are similar in content, but with other melodies insurgent songs "Oh there near Lviv [green sycamore]", "Oh there near Kiev [green sycamore]", "Oh, in the woods [, forest,] under the green oak", " Oh, there under Khust, under the green oak" and so on.

Background 
The song Our father is Bandera started to spread in media in March 2019 performed by priests led by Father Anatoly Zinkevich of the Orthodox Church of Ukraine. Zinkevich died on February 13, 2019. 

On January 22, 2020, the vocal ensemble of clergy “Pentarchy” sang this song in the house where Bandera was born. 

In the autumn of 2021, a group of Lviv students sang “Our father is Bandera” during the lessons and made the recordings available on TikTok. It launched a flashmob on social networks and encouraged others to sing this song. The flashmob acquired a great resonance in mass media.
A group of MEPs joined the action and sang “Our Father Bandera” in parliament . “The moment when the popular flash mob came from schools to the Verkhovna Rada,” wrote 21 October 2021 Oleksiy Honcharenko, a politician who uploaded the video from parliament to the network, on Facebook. The cast included Volodymyr Viatrovych, former head of Ukrainian Institute of National Memory.

References

External links
Text of the song with English translation

Ukrainian patriotic songs
Ukrainian-language songs
Ukrainian folk songs